Symphony No. 1 in C minor may refer to:

 Boris Alexandrovich Arapov	Symphony No. 1 (1947)
 Johannes Brahms	Symphony No. 1, op. 68 (1876)
 Anton Bruckner	Symphony No. 1 (1868)
 Norbert Burgmüller	Symphony No. 1, op. 2 (1831-3)[6]
 Frederic Cliffe	Symphony No. 1 (1889)[7]
 Carl Czerny	Symphony No. 1, Op. 781
 Antonín Dvořák	Symphony No. 1, B. 9 "The Bells of Zlonice" (1865)
 Louise Farrenc	Symphony No. 1, op. 32 (1841)
 Niels Gade	Symphony No. 1, op. 5 (1842)
 Edvard Grieg	Symphony in C minor, EG 119
 Johan Halvorsen	Symphony No. 1 (1923)
 Heinrich von Herzogenberg	Symphony No. 1, op. 50
 Richard Hol	Symphony No. 1 (1863)
 Albéric Magnard	Symphony No. 1, op. 4 (1890)[12]
 Daniel Gregory Mason	Symphony No. 1, op. 11 (1913-4)
 Felix Mendelssohn	Symphony No. 1, op. 11 (1824)
 Nikolai Myaskovsky	Symphony No. 1, op. 3 (1908, rev. 1921)
 John Knowles Paine	Symphony No. 1, op. 23 (1875)[15]
 Boris Parsadanian	Symphony No. 1 op. 5 (1958)
 Alice Mary Smith	Symphony No. 1 (1863)[22]
 Eduard Tubin	Symphony No. 1 ETW 1 (1931-4)
 Richard Wetz	Symphony No. 1 (1916)
 Felix Woyrsch	Symphony No. 1 (1908)

See also
 List of symphonies in C minor
 Joseph Martin Kraus Symphony in C minor, VB 142 (a reworking of the Symphony in C-sharp minor, VB 140)
 Xaver Scharwenka	Symphony, op. 60 (1885)
 Ignaz Pleyel	Symphony, Benton 121 (1778)[16]
 Ernest Schelling	Symphony in C minor[21]